The Arizona Complex League Royals are a Rookie-level affiliate of the Kansas City Royals, competing in the Arizona Complex League of Minor League Baseball. The team plays its home games at Surprise Stadium in Surprise, Arizona. The team is composed mainly of players who are in their first year of professional baseball either as draftees or non-drafted free agents.

History
The team first competed in the Arizona League (AZL) in 2003, succeeding the Kansas City Royals' Florida-based rookie team, the Gulf Coast League Royals. That season, the team fielded two squads in the league, differentiated by numerical suffixes (1 and 2). The Royals 1 squad won the league championship, defeating the AZL Rangers in the title game.

Starting in 2004, the team fielded a single squad in the league, except for the 2014 season when the team did not compete. The team returned to the league in 2015.

Prior to the 2021 season, the Arizona League was renamed as the Arizona Complex League (ACL). For the 2021 season, the team is again fielding two squads, differentiated by color suffixes (Blue and Gold).

Roster

References

External links
 Official website

Baseball teams established in 2003
Arizona Complex League teams
Professional baseball teams in Arizona
Kansas City Royals minor league affiliates
2003 establishments in Arizona
Sports in Surprise, Arizona